Baby Pac-Man is a hybrid maze and pinball game released in arcades by Bally Midway on October 11, 1982, nine months after the release of Ms. Pac-Man. The cabinet consists of a 13-inch video screen seated above a shortened, horizontal pinball table. The combination fits into roughly the same size space as an upright arcade machine. 7,000 units were produced.

Gameplay 
Play begins on the video screen, where the player controls Baby Pac-Man through a maze. Play mechanics are similar to Pac-Man in that the object is to navigate the maze while gobbling dots and avoiding ghosts. In contrast to earlier games in the series, Baby Pac-Man's maze starts with no energizers, which allow Baby Pac-Man to eat the ghosts. Instead, there are two vertical chutes at the bottom edge of the screen, which suspend video play and transfer the game to the pinball table located just below the monitor when the player travels down either of them.

Pinball mode 
The mechanical pinball section operates as a traditional, though smaller, pinball table. The player hits targets with a metal ball using two button-operated flippers. The player may earn energizers, gain new fruit bonuses, and increase tunnel speed, all of which are used in the video mode. After losing a ball, the game resumes on the video screen, but with the chutes closed. The player must clear the maze or lose a life to reopen the chutes. The game ends when the player runs out of lives.

References

External links 
 
 
 

1982 video games
Arcade games
Arcade-only video games
Midway pinball machines
Pac-Man arcade games
1982 pinball machines
Bally pinball machines
Unauthorized video games
Video games about children
Video games developed in the United States